Rusiate Namoro (born Naitasiri, circa 1966) is a Fijian former rugby union footballer, he played as a hooker or prop. Along with Koli Rakoroi, Elia Rokowailoa, Tom Mitchell, Epeli Naituivau and Setareki Tawake, he was one of the eight members of the country's armed forces to play for Fiji in a Rugby World Cup squad.

Career
His first cap for Fiji was against Samoa, at Suva, on 21 August 1982. He also was called up for the 1987 Rugby World Cup roster, where he played 2 matches, where his last international cap was against the quarter-final against France, at Auckland.

Notes

External links

1966 births
Fiji international rugby union players
Fijian rugby union players
Rugby union props
People from Naitasiri Province
Date of birth unknown
Rugby union hookers
Living people
I-Taukei Fijian people